WAW (an acronym for Where Are We) is the eleventh extended play by South Korean girl group Mamamoo. The EP was released on June 2, 2021 by RBW and distributed by Kakao Entertainment. WAW follows their 2020 Korean top-five EP Travel and is the first part of the group's 'WAW (Where Are We)' project, set to consist of the new album, concert, and documentary about the group. It contains four new songs, including the lead single "Where Are We Now".

Background and release 
In 2020, Mamamoo had one group comeback, with the Travel EP in November, and focused mainly on the four members' solo activities for the majority of the year. The group announced their comeback with the 'Where Are We' project in May 2021, with the first teaser trailer posted on May 13, 2021. The EP was to be the first release since most of the members renewed their contracts with their label RBW and was promoted with the release of several more teaser videos and concept photos.

WAW was released in full on June 2, 2021. The Japanese edition of the EP was released on September 29, featuring the new song "Strange Day" and Japanese-language versions of their two 2021 singles "Where Are We Now" and "Mumumumuch".

Commercial performance 
WAW debuted at number five on the Gaon Album Chart, with nearly 40,000 copies sold on the Hanteo platform in its first day. The EP went on to debut at number six on the monthly chart for June 2021, with 130,680 copies sold. WAW ended the year as the Gaon Album Chart's 76th best-selling physical release, with 135,000 copies sold in that year. In Japan, the EP peaked at number 17 on the Oricon Albums Chart and 13 on the Billboard Japan Hot Albums chart following the release of the Japanese edition in September. It has since sold upwards of 5,200 copies in the region.

Critical reception

Year-end lists

Track listing

Charts

Weekly charts

Year-end charts

Release history

References

2021 EPs
Kakao M EPs
Korean-language EPs
Mamamoo EPs